Itemirus is a genus of dromaeosaurid theropod dinosaur from the Turonian age of the Late Cretaceous period of Uzbekistan.

Discovery

Itemirus is known from a single small damaged fossil braincase or neurocranium, in 1958 found near the village of Itemir at the Dzharakuduk escarpment in layers of the Bissekty Formation. This holotype has accession number PIN 327/699. The type species, Itemirus medullaris, was named and described by Sergei Kurzanov in 1976. The generic name refers to Itemir. The specific name refers to the medulla oblongata, the brain part encased by the partial braincase.

Classification
Kurzanov noted anatomical similarities to the Tyrannosauridae and the Dromaeosauridae; he assigned Itemirus to a separate Itemiridae. In 2004 Thomas Holtz suggested it was a member of the Tyrannosauroidea. Nicholas Longrich and Philip J. Currie in 2009 included Itemirus in a cladistic analysis of internal dromaeosaurid relationships and found it to be a velociraptorine. In 2014, during a study assigning more material to Itemirus, it was found that the genus could be placed in Dromaeosaurinae in a phylogeny.

See also
 Timeline of dromaeosaurid research

References

External links 
 https://dinodata.de/animals/dinosaurs/pages_i/itemirus.php

Eudromaeosaurs
Late Cretaceous dinosaurs of Asia
Fossils of Uzbekistan
Bissekty Formation
Fossil taxa described in 1976
Taxa named by Sergei Kurzanov